Bitter Drink, Bitter Moon is the sixth full-length album by indie rock band Murder by Death released on September 25, 2012.

Track listing

Personnel
 Adam Turla – lead vocals, guitars, keyboards
 Sarah Balliet – cello, keyboards
 Dagan Thogerson – drums, percussion
 Matt Armstrong – bass
 Scott Brackett – keyboards, accordion, cornet, theremin, mandolin and backing vocals
 Samantha Crain – vocals (on "Lost River" and "Hard World")

References

2012 albums
Murder by Death (band) albums
Bloodshot Records albums